Ové is a surname. Notable people with the surname include:

Horace Ové (born 1939), Trinidad-born British filmmaker, photographer, painter, and writer
Indra Ové (born 1968), British film, television, and stage actress, daughter of Horace
Zak Ové (born 1966), British visual artist, son of Horace